Pridyider is a 2012 Filipino supernatural horror film directed by Rico Maria Ilarde, starring Janice de Belen and Andi Eigenmann. The film was released nationwide last September 19, 2012, under Regal Films.

This film is based on the episode of the same name from the 1984 film Shake, Rattle & Roll. Janice de Belen was the only cast member from the original episode who is part of the cast, co-star Joel Torre was also a part of the original film but was cast in another episode, Baso.

Plot
The story is about Tina Benitez (Andi Eigenmann) coming home from abroad to an empty house which she inherited from her parents. Not long after, strange things happen in the house, particularly in the kitchen, where an antique refrigerator is located.

Tina arrives in her former home, when she receives the news of her mother's (Janice de Belen)'s suicide and her father's disappearance. The refrigerator starts taking lives, starting with Tina's friend's pet cat. Her manager (Baron Geisler) tries to give her another chance, until the refrigerator takes him alive, despite Tina trying to rescue him from the tentacles. When she and her boyfriend tried to open the refrigerator, they were sprayed with blood.

The refrigerator was later revealed to be cursed by a demon who her mother made a deal with to sate her vengeance on her husband (Joel Torre), according to a former policeman/detective turned hunter who was obsessed with the case involving her parents. Tina's mother killed the woman who she suspects to be her husband's mistresses, chopping them up and feeding their corpses on the refrigerator, until the police saw her corpse in the refrigerator. the policeman/detective was blinded when he tried to open the refrigerator. They also consulted with the priest, giving them instructions to defeat the demon. Her father appears as a grotesque faced man, when he accidentally doused with boiling oil while he was cooking and he fell upon the floor, following the cauldron.

When they prepared the formula, the father sacrificed himself as bait. The refrigerator dragged him. The couple pushed the refrigerator, Tina descends to the hole, revealing the demon's victims, some dead, others barely conscious. She lighted the bomb, but her mother appears holding a cleaver. She fought with her own daughter, but her father, barely conscious, held his wife and asked his daughter to leave. The bomb goes off, destroying the hellhole and the refrigerator, saving the couple.

Cast

Main cast
Andi Eigenmann as Tina Benitez
JM De Guzman as James

Supporting cast
Janice de Belen as Mrs. Benitez
Bekimon as Agatha
Joel Torre as Mr. Benitez
Ronnie Lazaro as Detective Albay
Baron Geisler as Dick
Venus Raj as Celine
Lui Manansala as Tita Angie 
Hector Macaso as Atty. Taballo 
Rolly Inocencio as Priest

Rating
The rating of this film is rated PG-13 for some horror, strong violence, action, suspense and thriller.

See also
Shake, Rattle & Roll (film series)
Shake, Rattle & Roll (film)
List of ghost films

References

External links

Pridyider at Box Office Mojo

2012 films
Philippine supernatural horror films
Philippine ghost films
Films about witchcraft
2012 horror films
Regal Entertainment films
Films directed by Rico Maria Ilarde